Walker's marsupial frog (Gastrotheca walkeri) is a species of frog in the family Hemiphractidae.
It is endemic to Venezuela.
Its natural habitats are subtropical or tropical moist lowland forests and subtropical or tropical moist montane forests.

References

walkeri
Amphibians of Venezuela
Endemic fauna of Venezuela
Frogs of South America
Taxonomy articles created by Polbot
Amphibians described in 1980